Los Creadores is an Argentine children's television series, aired by Telefe in between 2015–2016 years.

In 2016, the series began to be broadcast by Netflix for all the Americas, in Spanish, English and Portuguese.

In 2016 and 2017, Los Creadores begins broadcasting on Señal Colombia, at 9 am every weekend.

Los Creadores is a children's television series, created by Pablo Aristizabal, executive director of the pedagogical media company «Competir». Creators series was made by A365 Studios and produced by Pol-ka Productions.

It is the first Argentine animated series that combines 3D and real images, allowing viewers to interact simultaneously between television and the web. The animated characters come from the Aula365, Creapolis and Kids News transmedia of the Argentinean company Competir, that work with innovative educational contents for children since 2007.

The story takes place in two worlds: the physical and the virtual, where different characters coexist : Real actors and 3D animated characters. It is a proposal with an audiovisual content that expands through the different technological platforms in a parallel and complementary way, with narrative games, applications, experiments, choreographies and interacting with the virtual world of Creápolis, the city of the creators.

Awards
 2015 Martín Fierro Awards
 Best children program
2016 Premio Tato
Best children program
2015 Honorable Camara de diputados de la Nacion Argentina
Distinguished Creators as a program of cultural and educational interest
2015 WSA- ONU
Best Digital Innovation with high impact on society

References

Argentine children's television series
Telefe original programming
2015 Argentine television series debuts